The Holy Jihad Brigades is a Palestinian organization that suddenly gained prominence in August 2006 by kidnapping two journalists in the Gaza Strip. The apparent purpose of this kidnapping was to demand the release of unspecified "Muslim prisoners" in the United States within 72 hours.

One of the reporters that was held by the group is New Zealander Olaf Wiig, husband of BBC correspondent Anita McNaught. The other is Steve Centanni, an American reporter for Fox News. They were held for about two weeks and then released.

According to one of the captured journalists, the organization forced them to convert to Islam. On the internet, the group has posted "Any infidel blood will have no sanctity," and they vowed to target all non-Muslims who entered Palestinian territory.

References

External links
BBC News:Video shows seized Gaza abductees
"Message from Olaf", Reuters
"BBC News: Al-Qaeda calls on US to convert

Jihadist groups in Palestine